Diario Paraguay-Rundschau was a German-language newspaper published in Piribebuy, Paraguay.

The newspaper was founded August 13, 2011. It was one of the most read daily online-newspapers in German language in Paraguay.

Newspapers published in Paraguay
German-language newspapers published in South America
Publications established in 2011
Cordillera Department
2011 establishments in Paraguay